Sheila McKinnon is a Canadian-born photographer and journalist who has lived most of her life in Italy. She has worked in Africa, Asia and Europe for The New York Times, Newsweek, Die Welt, Condé Nast, the International Herald Tribune, the Los Angeles Times, the Carnegie Foundation, the Knight Foundation, Saveur magazine, The Globe and Mail and other international and Italian publications including la Repubblica, il Messaggero, Corriere della Sera, l’Espresso, Panorama, Gente, Oggi, Artribune.com, Arte.it, Skytg 24, La Sapienza, Quotidiano di Sicilia, photographers.it, Kyotoclub.it, Mywhere.it.

McKinnon has worked in collaboration with various humanitarian organizations and UN agencies such as UNICEF, the FAO, UNFPA, IDLO, La Comunità di Sant’Egidio, Africare, and others. For 20 years her photography focused on the rights of children, of girls and of women. More recently the subject of her work has been Climate Change.

Personal Photography Exhibitions:

ON THEIR SIDE, a photographic exhibition created with UNICEF, Italy, on the rights of the child was first presented in Rome in 1999 at the PALAZZO DELLE ESPOSIZIONI ESPOSIZIONI and later was seen in cultural institutions and civic spaces throughout the peninsula.

INVISIBLE WOMEN, an exhibition of women in the developing world was inaugurated in Rome and presented in various Italian cities 2006 – 2008.

INVISIBLE WOMEN and the ENVIRONMENT was hosted by the Italian Ministry of the

Environment on the occasion of the pre G8 meetings in Syracuse, Sicily, in April 2009.

BORN INVISIBLE at the PALAZZO DUCALE in Genoa, Italy, February 2011.

INVISIBLE WOMEN at the FAO Gender network conference, Rome, March 4, 2014.

BORN INVISIBLE at the Museum of Rome in Trastevere, June 5 – September 28, 2014.

BORN INVISIBLE at the Robert F. Kennedy Int House, Florence, May 2015

INVISIBLE LIGHT at the Sala del Cenacolo, Camera dei Deputati, Italian Govt. Rome, 2018.

Photography books:

 "The Islands of Italy", photography book published by Houghton and Mifflin in 1992, text by Barbara Grizzutti Harrison.
 "Anna, Ciro & Compagnia", published by ERI – RAI – Italy 1985.
 "On Their Side – Dalla Parte dei Bambini" on the UN convention on the rights of the child 1999 for UNICEF, Italy.
 "The Sacred Fire", photo book on Indian Weddings published by Logart Press, Italy, 2002.
 "Invisible Women", sponsored by the City of Rome, Italy, 2006.
 "Born Invisible", was presented by the Fondazione Edoardo Garrone at the Palazzo Ducale in Genoa, Italy, February 3, 2011.
 "BORN INVISIBLE", with English and Italian texts, published by Gangemi Editore, Rome, June 5, 2014.

References

External links 
 Sheila McKinnon

Press 

 https://archive.today/20140613212747/http://www.artemagazine.it/arte-contemporanea/53905/a-roma-gli-scatti-di-shaila-mckinnon/http://tg24.sky.it/tg24/spettacolo/photogallery/2014/06/11/_born_invisible_sheila_mckinnon_mostra_roma_condizione_femminile.html
 http://www.huffingtonpost.it/2014/06/04/sheila-mckinnon-born-invisible-mostra-roma_n_5445368.html
 http://d.repubblica.it/attualita/2014/05/15/foto/mostra_pittura_donne_delta_of_venus_roma-2143024/1/
 http://www.ansa.it/lifestyle/notizie/societa/famiglia/2014/06/05/le-foto-di-born-invisible-destini-femminili-gestiti-senza-consenso_2782c4cf-525c-4ae9-8e255b9c6bb6efc3.html
 http://www.gangemi.com/scheda_articolo.php?id_prodotto=4798&isbn=9788849228687
 http://www.repubblica.it/2006/05/gallerie/esteri/mckinnon/mckinnon.html?ref=search%20Photo%20Archive
 http://www.corriere.it/foto-gallery/ambiente/18_febbraio_12/luce-invisibile-obiettivo-sheila-mckinnon-donne-cambiamenti-climatici-c1671954-0fde-11e8-a9ce-f6fed5e23abc.shtml
 http://tg24.sky.it/intrattenimento/photogallery/2018/02/08/sheila-mckinnon-invisible-light-mostra-roma.html
 https://www.wantedinrome.com/whatson/sheila-mckinnon-invisible-light.html
 http://www.radiosapienza.net/invisible-light-sheila-mckinnon-mostra-alla-camera-dei-deputati/
 https://www.tpi.it/foto/mostra-fotografica-diritti-donne-problema-ambientale-sheila-mckinnon-roma/
 http://www.artribune.com/mostre-evento-arte/sheila-mckinnon-invisible-light/

Canadian photojournalists
Living people
Canadian women photographers
Year of birth missing (living people)
Women photojournalists